Gordon Cecil Pladson (born July 31, 1956 in New Westminster, British Columbia, Canada) is a former Major League Baseball pitcher for the Houston Astros. He played parts of four seasons for the Astros, from  until .

References

External links

1956 births
Baseball people from British Columbia
Canadian expatriate baseball players in the United States
Living people
Major League Baseball pitchers
People from New Westminster
Major League Baseball players from Canada
Houston Astros players